TF6 was a French mini general-interest entertainment television channel aimed at young adult viewers. It existed between 18 December 2000 and 31 December 2014. The drop in viewership since 2009 and the failure of pay-TV via DTT are the causes of its disappearance.

History 
TF6 was founded in December 2000 by M6 and TF1 when they decided to bring closer their two competitor family project channels on the satellite service TPS, of which they are the two co-shareholders. This merger led the two groups to create a common company integrating TF6 and SerieClub and whose two groups are shareholders with 50%. That allows the new channel to make use of series and cinema catalogues of its two owners and to propose a richer offer. On April 24, 2014, TF1 and M6 announced the final closure of TF6 due to low audiences since 2009, The channel ceased broadcasting on December 31, 2014 at 11:59 p.m. using the song Love Me Again to close broadcasting. SerieClub replaced TF6 on Canalsat Caraïbes.

Organisation 
 Chairman of the board:  
 Laurent SOLLY

Director general:  
 Vincent Broussard

 Deputy Director General:  
 Thomas Crosson

Capital 
TF6 has a capital of €80,000 held with parity by Group TF1 and M6 Group.

Programs 
TF6 broadcasts shows intended for young adults, these include genres such as reality TV, entertainment, films and magazines.

Some of the shows include: 
 24 (24 heures chrono)
 Cold Case (Cold Case : Affaires classées)
 Gossip Girl
 Law & Order (New York, police judiciaire)
 Nashville
 New Girl
 Nikita
 The Oblongs
 The O.C. (Newport Beach)
 Supernatural
 Smallville
 Special Unit 2
 Terminator: The Sarah Connor Chronicles (Terminator : Les Chroniques de Sarah Connor)

References

External links
Official Site 

RTL Group
Television channels and stations established in 2000
Television channels and stations disestablished in 2014
Defunct television channels in France
2000 establishments in France
2014 disestablishments in France